Ololade Ebong is a Nollywood film director and cinematographer. She is the chief executive officer of Speed Films Productions and her movie, The Diary of Bolanle was the official selection at The Cannes Short Film Festival in France.

Early life and education 
Ololade grew up in Lagos State and she obtained her first degree in Theatre and Performing Arts from Ahmadu Bello University, Zaria, Kaduna State.  After that, she also studied cinematography at the New York Academy.

Career 
Ololade developed an interest in  cinematography after her participation in a practical field workshop at the National Film Institute in Jos, Plateau State. Her productions and co-productions included Art in the dark by Virginia Blatter, Allison by Suknrt, and The Diary of Bolanle. Her movies have also attracted the attention of the Angeles Cinema Festival of Nollywood in California, African International Film Festival in Nigeria, and California's women's Film Festival.  Her recent production is a movie title Ogeree.

Awards 

 2019: City People Awards by City People Magazine
 2021: Best New Producer of the year award by City People Magazine

References 

Living people
20th-century Nigerian actresses
21st-century Nigerian actresses
Nigerian film directors
Ahmadu Bello University alumni
Nigerian cinematographers
Nigerian film producers
Year of birth missing (living people)
Nigerian film actresses